At-Tariqah Al-Aliyyah Al-Qadiriyyah Al-Kasnazaniyyah (shortly known as  Kasnazani -  and occasionally as Al-Kasnazani) is a Sufi order popular in Iraq and Iran, and a sub-order of the Qadiri order. It is the largest tariqah in Iraq, and is spread widely across neighbouring countries. Its spiritual lineage to the Islamic Prophet Muhammad passes through his cousin and son-in-law Ali Ibn Abi Talib. The present spiritual master of the Kasnazani order is As Sayyed As Shaikh Nehro Abdul Kareem Al-Kasnazani Al-Qadiri Al-Hussaini, a descendant of the Islamic Prophet Muhammad through the lineage of his grandson Imam Husain ibn Ali. The Kasnazani order makes no distinction between Sunni and Shia followers.

The order claims to perform supernatural wonders (karāmāt) during which some of its adherents (dervishes) inflict wounds upon themselves, such as piercing their bodies, chewing blades or electrocuting themselves. It is also known for the Dhikr (Remembrance of Allah) performed using large drums (daf). "While sectarian strife threatens to tear Iraq apart, mystical Sufi orders like the Kasnazani still manage to bring Sunni and Shia Muslims, as well as Arabs and Kurds, together".

References

External links
 Kasnazani Order website (Arabic)
 Kasnazani website (English)
 Dailytimes Link

Islam in Iraq
Kurdish culture
Qadiri order
Kurdish words and phrases